The 2002 UCI Road World Cup was the fourteenth edition of the UCI Road World Cup. It was won by Paolo Bettini.

Races

Final standings

Individual

Team

References

 Final classification for individuals and teams from memoire-du-cyclisme.eu

 
 
UCI Road World Cup (men)